The City of Bellingham Police Department, more commonly known as the Bellingham Police Department and its initials BPD, is the primary law enforcement and investigation agency within the Bellingham, Washington city limits. Bellingham Police Department is the largest Police Department within Whatcom County, Washington and any other municipal agency north of King County, Washington. Bellingham Police Department is nationally accredited by the Washington Association of Sheriffs and Police Chiefs.

History
On January 12, 1979, Bellingham Police arrested the prolific Hillside Strangler in Bellingham. Chief Terry Mangan was among the officers on the case: he would later serve as chief of the Spokane Police Department and work for the FBI.

In 2002, a Jamaican woman named Una James came to Bellingham to search for her son, Lee Boyd Malvo, who had fallen under the influence of John Allen Muhammad. Bellingham Police alerted immigration authorities to James's presence; she and Malvo were arrested. Malvo and Muhammad would commit the Beltway sniper attacks later that year. An area immigration attorney commented that an immigrant going to the police for help and being arrested instead was common; the Seattle Post-Intelligencer noted that the arrest may have served to separate James and Malvo and draw Malvo closer to Muhammad.

In 2008 a Bellingham Police car was stolen when an officer left it running in a parking lot while responding to a call. The car was found a half hour later with two flat tires and missing its radio microphones.

In 2013, Bellingham Police attempted to break up a 500-person riot near Western Washington University after students began throwing beer bottles and other objects at idling police cars. Police used riot gear, pepper balls, smoke and flash grenades. It remains unclear what started the riot.

In May 2016, Bellingham Police became an acknowledged National accredited law enforcement agency by the Washington Association of Sheriffs and Police Chiefs (WASPC)

In May 2017, a Bellingham officer fatally shot a man after he charged the officer with a knife. The man was a suspect in a stabbing the previous year.

In 2017, Officer Brooks Laughlin assaulted a man during a traffic stop. Laughlin was arrested twice in 2018 before he resigned from the force in April. In November 2018 he was convicted of three counts of second-degree assault, two counts of felony harassment, two counts of violating a no-contact order, one count of felony stalking and one count of fourth-degree assault. Court papers state that he was the third Bellingham police officer in three years to be arrested for assault.

An initiative on the November 2021 ballot banned the Bellingham Police Depeartment, and the rest of the Bellingham city government, from the use of facial recognition and predictive policing technology.

References

External links 
Bellingham Police Department
BPD's listing at Officer Down Memorial Page.

Municipal police departments of Washington (state)